Chlorophytum acutum is a plant native to South Africa and Lesotho. Its common name in Zulu is iphamba. It most commonly grows in and around grassveld. Its conservation status is Least Concern.

References 

Agavoideae